Yongtai County (Foochow Romanized: Īng-tái) is a county of Fujian Province, China, it is under the administration of the prefecture-level city of Fuzhou, the provincial capital.

Transportation
 Yongtai Station on the Xiangtang–Putian Railway, a junction of the railways two branches (one runs north to Fuzhou, the other south to Putian). A large portion of the railway trackage within the county is in tunnels.

Climate

Administrative divisions
Towns:
Zhangcheng, Songkou, Wutong, Geling, Chengfeng, Qingliang, Changqing, Tong'an, Dayang

Towns:
Tangqian Township, Fuquan Township, Linglu Township, Chixi Township, Fukou Township, Gaiyang Township, Dongyang Township, Xiaba Township, Pangu Township, Hongxing Township, Baiyun Township, Danyun Township

References

External links

 

County-level divisions of Fujian
Fuzhou